The Richmond–Mahinda Cricket Encounter is an annual cricket big match played between the first XI cricket teams of Richmond College and Mahinda College in Galle, Sri Lanka.  It is one of the longest cricket match series in Sri Lanka, having  been played for over 114 years. The match which is also known as the "Lovers' Quarrel" in public, is played at the Galle International Stadium. Lovers' Quarrel was begun in 1905, under the two principals Rev. James Horne Darrel of Richmond College and Sir. Frank Lee Woodward of Mahinda College.

Match history & Series summary

Richmond - Mahinda cricket big match was played for the first time in 1905 at Galle esplanade, with the two principals, Rev. J. H. Darrell of Richmond and Mr. F. L. Woodward of Mahinda, officiating as umpires. Richmond College won the inaugural match and went on to win the next two matches in 1906 and 1907. Mahinda College's first victory was registered in 1908 and their last victory in a big match was recorded in 2008, while Richmond College's last win was recorded in 2019. Having broken a 30-year-long deadlock of draws, Mahindians registered an emphatic 10 wicket win over Richmondites in the 2008 encounter. After a 45-year-long winless streak, Richmondites also registered a win by an innings over Mahindians in the 2014 encounter and continued to a second consecutive win by an innings  in 2015.

In 1953, Mahindian Somasiri Ambawatte captured all ten Richmond’s wickets in an innings to claim the bowling record of the series and in the same match he scored a century to record the finest all round feat in the history of the big match. In 1972, Prasad Kariyawasam of Richmond College erased a 33-year-old big match record of 155 runs held by Mahindian Sirisena Hettige, with an unbeaten 156 runs. On the very next day of the same match Mahindians piled up the highest score by a team, when they totaled 359 with their top order batsman P. H. K. H. Ranasinghe scoring 162. It is the current record for the highest individual score by a batsman in the big match series. Jayantha Dias of Richmond College holds the record for most centuries in the big match, scoring consecutive centuries in 1968 & 1969.

Notable persons who have played

Mahindians
 H. W. Amarasuriya
 Douglas Dias Jayasinha
 Sirisena Hettige
 Basil Gunasekara
 D. H. de Silva
 D. P. de Silva
 D. L. S. de Silva
 Athula Samarasekera
 Dileepa Wickramasinghe
 Jayananda Warnaweera
 Upul Chandana
 Lasith Malinga
 Rumesh Buddika
 Thikshila De Silva
 Nisala Tharaka
Navod Paranavithana
   

Richmondites
C. W. W. Kannangara
 D. M. Rajapaksa
 D. A. Rajapaksa
 R. M. M. de Silva
 R. A. de Mel
 Prasad Kariyawasam
Nandasiri Jasentuliyana
 Ravi Arunthavanathan
 Champaka Ramanayake
 Chamila Gamage
 Suranga Lakmal
 Dhananjaya de Silva
 Wanindu Hasaranga de Silva
 Charith Asalanka
 AK Tyronne
 Kamindu Mendis
 Dhananjaya Lakshan

Past results

(w/o) - Walkover

Past records

Notable performances

 * - Remained not out

Centuries

See also
Cricket in Sri Lanka
Big Match

Notes & references

 Souvenirs, that were released to mark the 71st Richmond–Mahinda cricket encounter in 1976 &  97th encounter in 2002.

Big Matches
Mahinda College
Sri Lankan cricket in the 20th century
Sri Lankan cricket in the 21st century